George Michael Farley (January 14, 1934 – August 28, 2018) was an American football coach and baseball player. After coaching at various high schools throughout Wisconsin, he served as the head football coach at the University of Wisconsin–River Falls from 1970 to 1988. Before he entered coaching, Farley was a standout baseball player, first in high school at Alton, Illinois, then for two seasons in the Baltimore Orioles organization, and then in college at the University of Illinois.

Head coaching record

College

Notes

References

1934 births
2018 deaths
Illinois Fighting Illini baseball coaches
Illinois Fighting Illini baseball players
Marion Marauders players
Pine Bluff Judges players
Wisconsin–River Falls Falcons football coaches
High school football coaches in Wisconsin
Baseball players from St. Louis